Böhler-Uddeholm is an Austrian company specialized in producing tool steel and special forgings. It was formed in 1991 as a result of a merger between the Austrian parastatal Böhler and of Uddeholms AB of Sweden. The company has production sites in Austria, Germany, Sweden, Brazil, Belgium, Turkey, China, United States and Mexico. As of September 2008 it is a wholly owned subsidiary of voestalpine.

History
Böhler-Uddeholm was listed on the Vienna Stock Exchange between 10 April 1995 and 5 September 2008. In April 2007, voestalpine AG made a takeover offer for Böhler-Uddeholm - the bid was accepted by a majority of shareholders in June of that year. voestalpine completed a squeeze out of Böhler-Uddeholm's remaining shareholders in September 2008 to gain complete control. The former Böhler-Uddeholm divisions "Precision Strip" and "Welding Consumables" were transferred to other divisions within the voestalpine group. The remaining "High Performance Metals" "Forging" divisions were merged and became the fifth division, "Special Steel", of voestalpine AG.

External links
Official site
 Böhler Edelstahl GmbH & Co KG
 Uddeholms AB
 Villares Metals S.A.
 Buderus Edelstahl GmbH
 EschmannStahl GmbH & Co KG
 Böhler Schmiedetechnik GmbH & CoKG
 Buderus Edelstahl Schmiedetechnik GmbH

Former Böhler-Uddeholm AG companies
Division Welding Consumables
 Böhler Thyssen Schweißtechnik GmbH (see also UTP Schweissmaterial)
 Buderus Edelstahl Schmiedetechnik GmbH

Division Precision Strip
 Böhler-Uddeholm Precision Strip GmbH & Co KG
 Böhler-Uddeholm Precision Strip AB
 Buderus Edelstahl Band GmbH

Manufacturing companies based in Vienna
1991 establishments in Austria
Manufacturing companies of Austria